Elías Ahúja y Andría (January 8, 1863 – July 20, 1951) was a Spanish philanthropist, politician, businessman and academic. He was born in Cadiz and died in New York City.

He studied commerce at the Technical Institute of Boston. In 1903 he moved to the Republic of Chile and became Vice-president and later Director of the "Dupont Nitrate Company". In 1922 he returned to Spain and founded the "Elías Ahúja Charity", associated with the Good Samaritans. Interested in culture, he founded several sports, military, religious and educative institutions. He constructed hospitals, clinics, dining halls, schools, quarters, city council buildings, provided the poor with food, helped widows and orphans and did work to improve conditions in jails and sanitoriums.

He did much work to assist the Institución Exploradores de España (Scouts) in Puerto Santa Maria and his work favored other cities like Seville, Cadiz, Paterna de Rivera, Espera and Villaluenga del Rosario among others too. He was a candidate in the last elections of the Monarchy as and also an academic of the Real Hispano Americana y Bellas Artes de Cádiz.

He was honorary president of the Red Cross in Cadiz and Seville and was awarded state decorations for his philanthropy like the Military service cross, the Gold medal of the Red Cross, the Cross of the Civilian order, and the Gold medal of the Scouts, etc. However he was later accused of misusing funds and was forced to leave Spain in 1937 through Gibraltar. He died in 1951 in New York City.

His name is honored in Puerto Santa Maria and has a place and house dedicated to him and a council plaque. One of the campuses of the City University of Madrid takes his name.

Spanish philanthropists
20th-century Spanish politicians
Politicians from Cádiz
1863 births
1951 deaths